The Government Inspectorate is a ministry-level agency in Vietnam that exercises the function of state administration of inspection, citizen reception, complaint and denunciation settlement and anti-corruption throughout Vietnam; conducts inspection, settles complaints and denunciations and combats corruption in accordance with laws. The Government Inspectorate is headed by an Inspector-General. The current Inspector-General of the Government is Đoàn Hồng Phong.

Departments
 The Office of the Government Inspectorate
 Department of Economic Sectors Inspection (Department I)
 Department of Internal Affairs and General Economics Inspection (Department II)
 Department of Socio-Cultural Inspection (Department III)
 Department of Post-Inspection Supervision, Evaluation and Handling
 Department of Citizen Reception, Complaint and Denunciation Handling
 Department of Legal Affairs
 Department of International Cooperation
 Department of Planning, Finance and General Affairs
 Department of Organisation and Personnel
 Bureau of Settlement of Complaints, Denunciations and Inspection for the Northern Region (Bureau I)
 Bureau of Settlement of Complaints, Denunciations and Inspection for the Central Region (Bureau II)
 Bureau of Settlement of Complaints, Denunciations and Inspection for the Southern Region (Bureau III)
 Bureau of Anti-corruption (Bureau IV)
 Project Management Unit
 Information Centre
 Inspector Training College
 Inspection Magazine
 Inspection Newspaper
 Government Inspectorate Research Institute

External links
 Official website

Government ministries of Vietnam
Government of Vietnam
Governmental office in Hanoi